Jim Payne may refer to:

Jim Payne (folk singer) (born 1955), Newfoundland folk singer
Jim Payne (glider pilot) chief pilot with the Perlan Project Mission 2
Jim Payne (golfer) (born 1970), English golfer
Jim Payne, principal of Quixtar, an American company connected to Alticor
 James Payne, drummer for Tommy James and the Shondells 
James Arthur Payne (1884–1968), known as Jim, American fly rod maker, designer and business owner

See also
Jimmy Payne (1926–2013), English footballer
James Payne (disambiguation)